Sonya Dyhrman is an earth and environmental sciences professor who studies the physiology of phytoplankton and their role within marine ecosystems. She is also a fellow of the American Academy of Microbiology.

Education and career 
Dyrhman grew up in Washington where she spent days clamming on Puget Sound and started scuba diving before she could drive. She went to Dartmouth College and received her B.A. in 1994. She then earned her Ph.D. from Scripps Institution of Oceanography, University of California, San Diego in 1999. Following her Ph.D., she joined Woods Hole Oceanographic Institution as postdoc and transitioned onto the scientific staff in 2002. In 2014, she moved to Columbia University, Lamont–Doherty Earth Observatory (LDEO) where she is a professor in earth and environmental sciences.

Research 
Dyhrman uses molecular tools to examine phytoplankton in marine systems, with a focus on their ecosystem structure and biogeochemical impact. Her Ph.D. research examined the role of phosphate stress on phytoplankton where she identified proteins found in dinoflagellates grown under phosphate-limited conditions and then applied this tool to assess phosphate-stress conditions in the field. She has examined variability in how phytoplankton consume and produce different forms of phosphorus including dissolved organic phosphorus, polyphosphate, and phosphonates. Dyhrman has also looked at cell-specific phosphorus stress using Trichodesmium as a model cyanobacteria, and specifically examined how use Trichodesmium use phosphonate in the ocean. A portion of her research interests include investigations into diatoms, cyanobacteria, and harmful algal organisms.

Selected publications

Awards and honors 
 Marie Tharp Fellow, Columbia University Earth Institute (2007)
 Sir Allan Sewell Fellow, Griffith University
 Kavli Fellow, National Academy Frontiers of Science 2014, 2016)
 Fellow, American Academy of Microbiology (2019)

References

External links 
 

Fellows of the American Academy of Microbiology
Dartmouth College alumni
University of California, San Diego alumni
Lamont–Doherty Earth Observatory people
Living people
Women ecologists
American oceanographers

1972 births